Raybearer is a 2020 young adult fantasy novel by Nigerian American writer Jordan Ifueko, published by Amulet Books. It is the first book in the Raybearer Series, In her debut novel, Ifueko creates a fantasy set in a world that draws from her Nigerian heritage and incorporates a twenty-first-century twist for her young adult audience.

Raybearer is a New York Times Bestseller and has been lauded by media reviews. The book, published August 18, 2020 by Abrams, was influenced by Ifueko's knowledge of West African culture, and experiences as an American child of immigrants in California.

A sequel, Redemptor, was published August 17, 2021.

Synopsis 
Raybearer follows a young girl, Tarisai, who is bound by a magical wish made by her mother, who is absent and distant in Tarisai's early life. Tarisai has the ability to see the stories of other people's lives with a single touch, while her story unfolds and is yet to be seen. A part of her life is revealed to her when she discovers that her mother, known as The Lady, is human, while her father is an "alagbato," a magical being, and she was only conceived to fulfill her mother's evil wish to kill the Crown Prince. This all becomes convoluted when The Lady sends her to the city of Oluwan, the capital of the Aritsar Empire, and is welcomed into a group of other children who will train and compete to become one of the Crown Prince's closest confidants. In this newfound community, Tarisai learns and uncovers the secret histories of their world. This group of children will be trained to compete for a spot in the Crown Prince's Council of 11. If Tarisai is picked, she will be joined with the other members of a council through the Ray, a bond deeper than blood. Tarisai does not want to be her mother's pawn, but she is compelled to obey her mother's wish. This novel is a test of Tarisai's strength to make her own path, or to succumb to that of her mother.

Television adaptation
In September 2021, it was announced that Netflix will be adapting the novel into a television series, under a new overall deal with Gina Atwater. The project will be produced by Suger23 and Macro Television Studios with Atwater as writer, director and producer.

Reception 

Raybearer is a New York Times Bestseller and was named one of the best books of the year by People Magazine, Buzzfeed, New York Public Library, Chicago Public Library, Kirkus Reviews, School Library Journal, and Publishers Weekly.

The book has received many positive reviews. Entertainment Weekly called the book "dazzling." Buzzfeed said it was "one of the most exceptional YA fantasies of all time." People Magazine said it was a "brilliantly conceived fantasy." Seventeen Magazine called it a "bold new world," and PopSugar lauded Ifueko's "exquisitely detailed world."

Awards and recognitions 

 Andre Norton Award Nominee (2020)
 Kitschies Golden Tentacle (Debut) Shortlist (2020)
 NPR Best Books in December 2020 
 Goodreads Choice Award Nominee for Young Adult Fantasy & Science Fiction (2020)
 Goodreads Choice Award Nominee for Debut Novel (2020)
 BookNest Award Nominee for Best Debut Novel (2020)
 Association for Library Service to Children's Notable Children's Books (2021)
 American Library Association's (ALA) Top Ten Amazing Audiobooks for Young Adults (2021)
 ALA Top Ten Best Fiction (2021)
 Ignyte Award for Best Novel for Young Adult Fiction finalist (2021)
 Audie Award for Fantasy finalist (2021)
 Waterstones Children's Book Prize for Older Readers Longlist (2021)
 Lodestar Award Nominee (2021)

Sequel 
A sequel titled Redemptor was published in August 2021. Buzzfeed named Redemptor one of the best books of August 2021, saying it was "[i]mmersive and gorgeously written."

References

See also 

Debut fantasy novels
Nigerian fantasy novels
American fantasy novels
Young adult novel series
2020 debut novels
2020 fantasy novels
2020 Nigerian novels
2020 American novels
American bildungsromans
Literature by African-American women
Amulet Books books